The 1959 Railway Cup Hurling Championship was the 33rd series of the inter-provincial hurling Railway Cup. Two matches were played between 17 March 1959 and 7 June 1959 to decide the title. It was contested by Connacht, Leinster and Munster.

Munster entered the championship as the defending champions.

On 7 June 1959, Munster won the Railway Cup after a 7-11 to 2-06 defeat of Connacht in the final at Croke Park, Dublin. It was their third Railway Cup title in succession. The new Hogan Stand was officially opened on the day of the final.

Munster's Christy Ring was the Railway Cup top scorer with 4-05.

Results

Semi-final

Final

Top scorers

Overall

Single game

References

External links
 Munster Railway Cup-winning teams

Railway Cup Hurling Championship
Railway Cup Hurling Championship